Sonita may refer to:

Sonita Kingdom, an ancient Indian kingdom
Sonita Alizadeh, Afghan rapper
Sonita Sutherland, Jamaican athlete
Sonita (film), a documentary about the Afghan rapper 
A common misspelling of Sinitta, an American–British singer